Visible: Out on Television is a documentary miniseries about the representation of LGBTQ+ people in television, both on-screen and behind the camera. Directed by Ryan White, all 5 episodes were released on Apple TV+ on February 14, 2020.

The five episodes are broadly chronological; each involving a theme — The Dark Ages, Television as a Tool, The Epidemic, Breakthroughs, and The New Guard — the miniseries combines archive footage with new interviews of LGBTQ+ people in the television industry.

Episodes

Reception

Critical reception 
On review aggregator Rotten Tomatoes, the miniseries holds an approval rating of 100% based on 14 reviews, with an average rating of 8.67/10. The website's critical consensus reads, "Well-crafted and often powerful, Visible: Out on Television is as vital and vibrant as the community at its center." On Metacritic, which uses a weighted average, the miniseries has a score of 89 out of 100 based on 7 reviews, indicating "universal acclaim".

Accolades

See also
The Celluloid Closet (1995), a documentary film about LGBTQ+ representation in film

References

External links
 
 
 
 

2020 American television series debuts
2020 American television series endings
2020s American documentary television series
2020s American LGBT-related television series
Documentary television series about art
Works about the history of Hollywood, Los Angeles
LGBT history in California
History of LGBT civil rights in the United States
Apple TV+ original programming
Documentaries about LGBT topics